Luis A. González may refer to:

 Luis González (infielder) (born 1979), infielder in Major League Baseball
 Luis A. Gonzalez (judge), American judge
 Luis Alberto González, Colombian cyclist